Believe Again: Australian Tour 2009 is a live DVD and album by Australian singer-songwriter Delta Goodrem. Filming took place during the final two Sydney shows of her Believe Again Tour on 3 and 4 February 2009 at the State Theatre. It was released on 18 September 2009 through Sony Music with the DVD cover design placed in the hands of Goodrem fans, as part of a competition on her official website. The winning cover was designed by Australian graphic designer, Jacky Ho. This release became Goodrem's third consecutive #1 on the ARIA DVD Chart. On 22 July 2010 Delta was awarded an ARIA #1 Chart Award for her 'Believe Again Tour' DVD achieving number one status and sales in the past year.

Track listing

CD

DVD
"Believe Again"
"Innocent Eyes"
"In This Life"
"I Can't Break It to My Heart"
"Not Me, Not I"
"Out of the Blue"
"Brave Face" (contains excerpts of "Billie Jean")
"Mistaken Identity"
"You Will Only Break My Heart" 
"Born to Try" 
"Butterfly" 
"That's Freedom" 
"Running Away" 
"Queen of the Night" 
"Sweet Dreams (Are Made of This)" 
"Predictable"
"Do You Love Me" (duet with Brian McFadden)
"Almost Here" (duet with Brian McFadden)
"Together We Are One Day" 
"Lost Without You"
"Believe Again" (reprise)

Extras
Making of the tour
Behind the scenes
Stage Visuals:
"Queen of the Night"
"Sweet Dreams (Are Made of This)"
Special guest segment with Brian McFadden

DVD Packaging Art Direction & Design
Adam Dal Pozzo adamdalpozzo.com

Charts

Weekly charts

Certifications

References 

Delta Goodrem video albums
2009 video albums
Live video albums
2009 live albums